Takatsuki Hagitani Soccer Stadium is a football stadium in Takatsuki, Osaka, Japan. It is the location in which Speranza F.C. Osaka-Takatsuki plays.

External links

Football venues in Japan
Sports venues in Osaka Prefecture
Takatsuki, Osaka